Magical Flowers is a Canadian dramatic short film, directed by Jean-Marc Vallée and released in 1995. The film stars Marc-André Grondin as DJ, a young boy struggling to cope with his father's alcoholism.

The film won the Genie Award for Best Theatrical Short Film at the 16th Genie Awards.

A sequel, Magical Words (Les Mots magiques), was released in 1998. At the time, the two films were planned as part of a trilogy, with the third film to be titled Les Temps magiques ("Magical Times"), but the third film was never completed.

References

External links
 

1995 films
1995 drama films
Best Theatrical Short Film Genie and Canadian Screen Award winners
1995 short films
Films directed by Jean-Marc Vallée
French-language Canadian films
Canadian drama short films
1990s Canadian films